Ylena In-Albon was the defending champion, but chose not to participate.

Xun Fangying won the title, defeating Indy de Vroome in the final, 3–6, 6–3, 7–6(8–6).

Seeds

Draw

Finals

Top half

Bottom half

References

External links
Main Draw

Shimadzu All Japan Indoor Tennis Championships - Singles
2020 Singles